Magic is the sixth and final studio album by British hard rock band Gillan, released in September 1982. It features eight original songs, mostly co-written by Ian Gillan and Colin Towns, and a cover of Stevie Wonder's 1973 hit single "Living for the City". This cover was released as a 7" single, in both picture-bag and picture-disc editions, and was accompanied by a promotional video.

Although the album was generally accepted by Gillan's staunch UK following, it failed to achieve the chart success of Glory Road or Future Shock, peaking at No. 17 in the UK chart.

Allegedly, many of the album's lyrics cryptically predict the end of the band.

Magic was reissued in 1989 and in 2007 with seven bonus tracks, including cover versions and B-sides.

Track listing
All songs written by Ian Gillan and Colin Towns except where noted.

Side one
 "What's the Matter" (Gillan, John McCoy, Janick Gers) – 3:33 
 "Bluesy Blue Sea" (Gillan, Gers) – 4:48 
 "Caught in a Trap" – 3:34
 "Long Gone" – 3:59
 "Driving Me Wild" – 3:05

Side two
"Demon Driver" – 7:15
 "Living a Lie" – 4:27
 "You're So Right" (Gillan, McCoy) – 2:55 
 "Living for the City" (Stevie Wonder) – 4:27 
 "Demon Driver (reprise)" – 0:42

1989 Re-release bonus tracks
In 1989 Virgin re-released the album in CD format. The revised track listing was as follows:

"Breaking Chains" (Gillan, Gers) – 3:28 
 "Fiji" (Gillan, McCoy) – 5:21 
 "Purple Sky" (Gillan, McCoy) – 3:24 
 "South Africa" (Bernie Marsden) – 4:03 
 "John" (Gillan) – 4:44 
 "South Africa" (12" extended version) (Marsden) – 7:18 
 "Helter Skelter" (John Lennon, Paul McCartney) – 3:26*
 "Smokestack Lightning" (Chester Burnett) – 4:08*

Total running time 74:50

* Previously unreleased

2007 Re-release bonus tracks
In 2007 the album was re-released in CD format again on the Edsel Records label. 
"Breaking Chains" – 3:28
 "Fiji" – 5:21
 "Purple Sky" – 3:24
 "Helter Skelter" – 3:26
 "Smokestack Lightning" – 4:08
 "South Africa" – 4:03
 "John" – 4:44
 "South Africa" (12" extended version) – 7:18

Personnel
Gillan
 Ian Gillan – vocals, harmonica, producer on "South Africa"
 Janick Gers – guitar
 Colin Towns – keyboards
 John McCoy – bass guitar
 Mick Underwood – drums

Production
 Mick Glossop – producer, engineer
 Bob Broglia – assistant engineer
 Kingsway Recorders Ltd. – executive producer
 Paul "Chas" Watkins – producer and engineer on "Purple Sky"
 Nick Davis – engineer on "South Africa"
 James "Jimbo" Barton – remix on "South Africa"
 Dave Dragon – illustration
 Bitter & Twisted – design

Charts

Album

Singles
Living for the City

References 

1982 albums
Gillan (band) albums
Virgin Records albums